Tim Cooper may refer to:
Tim Cooper (brewer), managing director of Coopers Brewery
Tim Cooper (footballer), New Zealand international